Harry James Albright was the director of communications for the Friends World Committee for Consultation (FWCC) from 2008 to 2013, and editor of The Friend magazine from 1997 to 2004. He is also the co-owner of a training and communications consultancy.

Education
Albright was born in Geneva, Switzerland, the son of Leland S. Albright Jr., a Canadian diplomat, and Mary Albright. He attended the International School of Geneva and Pickering College in Newmarket, Ontario. He studied journalism at Carleton University in Ottawa.

Career
He was a journalist at the Elmira Independent when it won Canada's most prestigious journalism prize, the Michener Award, in 1990. The small Ontario newspaper was honoured for its blanket coverage of a prolonged legal battle over contamination of the Elmira–St. Jacobs municipal water supply. The Elmira Independent was part of the North Waterloo Publishing group, and Albright also worked on other group titles. He was production manager for the Elora Sentinel and Fergus Thistle, and news editor of the agricultural newspaper The Farmgate.

With his background in agricultural journalism, Albright moved to the UK in 1993 to become the press officer for the National Farmers Union in the East Midlands region, managing the regional response to the BSE crisis that affected the UK in the mid-1990s.

The Friend and FWCC
In 1997, Albright became editor of The Friend, based in London, England, and later communications director for FWCC, the worldwide consultative body for Quakers. He continues as a consultant to various Quaker and other organizations.

Personal life
Albright is married to Beth Peakall and they have two children.

References

Canadian non-fiction writers
Canadian newspaper editors
Canadian male journalists
Canadian magazine editors
Canadian Quakers
People from Geneva
Living people
International School of Geneva alumni
Year of birth missing (living people)